"Don'cha Hear Them Bells" is a 1953 song written by Les Paul and recorded by Les Paul and Mary Ford. The song was released as a single.

Background
The song was released as a 7" vinyl 45 single on Capitol Records, 45-11878, F2614, backed with "The Kangaroo", in 1953. The recording was also released as a 10" 78 as 2614. The song was composed by Les Paul and was published by the Iris-Trojan Music Corporation in New York. "Don'cha Hear Them Bells" reached no. 13 on the Billboard Jockey Chart in November, 1953 in a four-week chart run and no. 28 on the Cash Box chart in a 10-week chart run. The flip side "The Kangaroo" reached no. 23 on the Cash Box chart.

Album appearances
The song appeared on the 1991 album Les Paul: The Legend and the Legacy on Capitol Records and on the 2007 release Les Paul: The Essential Collection on West End Records.

References

Sources
Jacobson, Bob. Les Paul: Guitar Wizard. Madison, Wisconsin: Wisconsin Historical Society Press, 2012.
Shaughnessy, Mary Alice. Les Paul: An American Original. New York: W. Morrow, 1993.
Wyckoff, Edwin Brit. Electric Guitar Man: The Genius of Les Paul. Genius at work! Berkeley Heights, N.J.: Enslow Publishers, 2008.

Les Paul songs
Mary Ford songs
1953 songs
1953 singles
Songs written by Les Paul
Capitol Records singles